Storyteller is the second studio album by American singer-songwriter Crystal Waters, released on May 17, 1994, by Mercury Records. The album peaked at number 199 on the US Billboard 200, number 73 on the Top R&B/Hip-Hop Albums chart and number 8 on the Top Heatseekers chart. Four singles were released from the album: "What I Need", "Relax", "Ghetto Day", and the hit, "100% Pure Love". "Ghetto Day" samples The 5th Dimension's 1968 hit "Stoned Soul Picnic".

Storyteller sold 1 million copies and was certified gold in the United States.

Reception

The album debuted at 199 on the US Billboard 200. Since its release, it has gone gold, and sold over 1 million copies worldwide. Upon release, the album received generally positive reviews from contemporary music critics. It won Vibe'''s 1994 Music Poll for Best Club/Dance Album. It was the no. 12 Best Album of 1994 in Spin''.

Track listing

Personnel
Drums, percussion – Teddy Douglass, Maurice Fulton, Richard Payton, Doug Smith, Sean Spencer, Jay Steinhour
Drum programming – Maurice Fulton, Sean Spencer
Guitars – Wayne Cooper
Keyboards and programming – David Anthony, Hoza Clowney, Neal Conway, Charles Dockins, Maurice Fulton, Mark Harris, Richard Payton, Fruity Roberts, Doug Smith
Vibraphone – David Bach
Saxophone – Greg Thomas (also scatting)
Horns – Greg Boyer, Benny Cowan
Multi-instruments – Eric Kupper
Backing vocals – Katreese Barnes, Kenny Hicks, Adrianne McDonald, Antionette Robertson, Novelair Thomas, Audrey Wheeler

Charts

References

1994 albums
Mercury Records albums
Crystal Waters albums
Electronica albums by American artists
Albums produced by Easy Mo Bee